The Paralympics Australia recognises the achievements of Paralympic athletes, coaches and administrators through several awards. These awards generally relate to performances at the Summer and Winter Paralympic Games and are not necessarily awarded annually.

Australian Paralympian of the Year

Male Athlete of the Year

Female Athlete of the Year

Rookie Athlete of the Year

Award changed from Junior to Rookie Athlete of the Year in 2016.

Coach of the Year

Team of the Year

Uncle Kevin Coombs Medal for the Spirit of the Games
Named after indigenous wheelchair basketballer Kevin Coombs. The Medal is awarded to the athlete that embodies the 'spirit of the Games'.

President’s Award for Excellence in Sportsmanship

Paralympic Achievement Award

Australian Paralympic Hall of Fame

It was established in 2011 to recognise individuals that have made a significant contribution to Australia's paralympic achievements and to enhance the profile of Paralympians in the Australian community.

Australian Paralympic Medal
This award recognises significant long term contribution to Paralympic sport in Australia and is the highest honour for a non-athlete.

See also
 Australia at the Paralympics
 Australia at the Summer Paralympics
 Australia at the Winter Paralympics

References

Australian sports trophies and awards
Australia at the Paralympics